Susan Stahnke (born 7 September 1967) is a German TV presenter. She was born  in Hamelin.

Career 
Stahnke was a presenter for the federal broadcaster NDR (Northern Germany's Broadcast) before she worked as a regular news reader for the national German news show Tagesschau for seven years.

Currently she presents a TV format called Tischgespräch where she has already interviewed guests such as Hardy Krüger and Franz Beckenbauer.

References

External links 

German film actresses
German stage actresses
1967 births
German television presenters
Living people
20th-century German actresses
21st-century German actresses
German women television presenters
Ich bin ein Star – Holt mich hier raus! participants
ARD (broadcaster) people
Tagesschau (ARD) presenters and reporters
Norddeutscher Rundfunk people